Tommaso Romito (born 9 February 1982 in Bari) is an Italian footballer who plays for Pergocrema.

Career
Romito was signed by Napoli  in January 2005 and won the promotion with club in 2006. He was out of Napoli plan at Serie B and then Serie A, Romito was loaned to Salernitana of Serie C1 and Pescara of Serie C1. In summer 2008, he was signed by Pescara in co-ownership deal.

External links
 

1982 births
Living people
Footballers from Bari
Italian footballers
Association football defenders
Manfredonia Calcio players
S.S. Chieti Calcio players
S.S.C. Napoli players
U.S. Salernitana 1919 players
Delfino Pescara 1936 players
S.S. Virtus Lanciano 1924 players